Seo Ji-young (born June 2, 1981) is a South Korean former singer. She was formerly a member of pop group Sharp. The group released six albums before their breakup in 2002, attributed to the feud between Seo and fellow female member Lee Ji-hye. 

She is daughter of Seo Seung-hwan and his wife Hong Seung-hee. Her father is the 19th president of Yonsei University, and Minister of Land, Infrastructure and Transport during President Park Geun-hye's administration (2013-17). Her paternal grandfather, from the large Seo family of Dalseong, was Seo Jeon-chul (1924-2010), 20th Minister of National Defense of South Korea, and president of the Korea Baseball Association.

Sharp was a group that was created by member Seo Jiyoung's influential family, who at the time was one of the wealthiest in the industry. 

As a solo artist, she has released two albums, with her last one released in January 2007. Her singles include "Stay in Me" and "Hey Boy".

Seo is married to financier Kim Kyung-gu, who is five years her senior. More than one thousand guests attended their wedding on November 10, 2011 at the Shilla Hotel in Seoul, South Korea.

Sharp albums
 the sharp (1998)
 the sharp +2 (1999)
 The Four Letter Word Love (2000)
 4ever Feel So Good (2001)
 Flat Album (2001)
 StYlE (2002)

Solo albums
 Listen to My Heart (2005)
 Different This Time (2007)

Music video
 "Stay in Me"
 "Hey Boy"
 "Fatigued"

TV appearance
 X-man (SBS)
 Real Romance: Love Letter (SBS)
 Sorry I Love You (KBS, 2004)

References

External links 
 SEOJIYOUNG.net

1981 births
K-pop singers
South Korean female idols
Living people
South Korean women pop singers
South Korean television actresses
21st-century South Korean singers
21st-century South Korean women singers